Moonfleet & Other Stories is the eighteenth original album by singer and songwriter Chris de Burgh, released in 2010. This album includes two parts, one including the story of Moonfleet (18 tracks), based on J. Meade Falkner's homonymous 1898 novel; and the other one, including 6 tracks, called Other Stories. The latter half of the title echoes that of De Burgh's 1975 album Spanish Train and Other Stories. For the launch of the album, de Burgh signed an exclusive deal with supermarket giant Asda for the physical release in the UK, and worked with digital companies AWAL and Topspin Media to distribute it digitally around the globe.

Track listing

Moonfleet 
All songs written by Chris de Burgh and John Meade Falkner
"The Moonfleet Overture" -5:03
"The Village Of Moonfleet..." (Narration) -1:27
"The Light On The Bay" -1:57
"Have A Care" -2:52
"For Two Days And Nights..." (Narration) -1:14
"Go Where Your Heart Believes" -4:11
"The Escape" -4:19
"And So It Was..." (Narration) -0:29
"The Days Of Our Age" -1:54
"The Secret Of The Locket" -3:32
"With Heavy Heart..." (Narration) -0:36
"My Heart's Surrender" -4:10
"Treasure And Betrayal" -3:43
"Moonfleet Bay" -3:06
"The Storm" -3:23
"Greater Love" -3:29
"In The Years That Followed..." (Narration) -1:23
"The Moonfleet Finale" -3:00

Other Stories 
All songs written by Chris de Burgh
"Everywhere I Go" -3:36
"The Nightingale" -3:47
"One Life, One Love" -3:42
"Why Mona Lisa Smiled" -3:37
"Pure Joy" -3:06
"People Of The World" - 3:50

Personnel 

 Chris de Burgh – lead and backing vocals, guitars
 Phil Palmer – guitars, additional backing vocals
 Neil Taylor – guitars
 Geoffrey Richardson – banjo, mandolin, fiddle, viola, whistle, additional backing vocals
 Chris Porter – keyboards, percussion, narrator
 Peter Gordeno – keyboards, additional backing vocals
 Chris Cameron – acoustic piano, orchestral arrangements
 Nigel Hopkins – accordion, Hammond organ, Moog bass, additional backing vocals
 Jerry Maheen – bass guitar, bassoon, additional backing vocals
 Geoff Dugmore – drums, percussion, additional backing vocals
 Nick Ingman – orchestral conductor
 The Royal Philharmonic Orchestra – orchestra
 Hazel Fernandez - backing vocals
 Jakko Jakszyk - backing vocals

Production 

 Produced by Chris de Burgh and Chris Porter
 Engineered and Mixed by Chris Porter
 Additional Engineering – Andrew Dudman and Joe Kearns
 Orchestra recordings at Abbey Road Studios.
 Band and additional orchestra recordings at British Grove Studios.
 Mixing and additional recording at Stanley House Studios.
 Art Direction – Alex Hutchinson
 Sleeve Design – Chris de Burgh, SJ Johnson and Kenny Thomson.
 Photography – Rebecca Miller
 Cover Photo – Christie Goodwin
 Management – Kenny Thomson

Year-end charts

References

Chris de Burgh albums
2010 albums